Team Jumbo–Visma is a women's professional road bicycle racing team based in the Netherlands.

History
In October 2020,  announced the launch of a Women's team, aimed at "completing" the team and developing women's cycling within and outside the Netherlands using the team's pre-existing experience and facilities. The team's goal is to build the best women's team in the world.

Team roster

Major wins
2021
Gent–Wevelgem, Marianne Vos
Amstel Gold Race, Marianne Vos
Stages 3 & 7 Giro Rosa, Marianne Vos
 Overall Kreiz Breizh Elites Dames, Anna Henderson
 Points classification, Anouska Koster
Stages 1 & 2, Anna Henderson
Stage 2 Ladies Tour of Norway, Riejanne Markus
Holland Ladies Tour 
 Points classification, Marianne Vos
Prologue, Stages 4 & 5, Marianne Vos
 National Time Trial Championships, Anna Henderson

2022
 UCI Cyclo-cross World Championships, Marianne Vos
Prologue Grand Prix Elsy Jacobs, Anna Henderson
RideLondon Classique
 Mountains classification, Anna Henderson
 British rider classification, Anna Henderson
 National Under-23 Time trial Championships, Noemi Rüegg
 National Road race Championships, Riejanne Markus
 National Under-23 Road race Championships, Noemi Rüegg
Stages 2 & 5 Giro d'Italia Donne, Marianne Vos
Stages 2 & 6 Tour de France, Marianne Vos
Stages 1, 2, 3 & 6 Tour of Scandinavia, Marianne Vos
Stage 4 Simac Ladies Tour, Riejanne Markus

2023
GP Sven Nys, Fem van Empel

National, continental and world champions
2021
 British Time Trial, Anna Henderson
2022
 World Cyclo-cross, Marianne Vos
 Swiss U23 Time Trial, Noemi Rüegg
 Netherlands Road Race, Riejanne Markus
 Swiss U23 Road Race, Noemi Rüegg

References

External links

UCI Women's Teams
Cycling teams based in the Netherlands
Cycling teams established in 2020
2020 establishments in the Netherlands